Beast is the debut album by the Canadian band Beast. The album was made available internationally on iTunes on November 4, 2008. While it has been physically released in Canada, international releases have not been announced.

Their self-titled debut album was very well received by critics, including The Globe and Mail, which suggested that Beast “stands an excellent chance of being the next big success story from the Montreal music scene”, and the Toronto Star, which called it “one of the most strikingly original and swaggeringly bad-ass Canadian albums to rear its head in recent memory”. allmusic said the album sounds "a little like Portishead fronted by Annie Lennox" and said that "even if the album isn't groundbreaking, the vocals are top-notch and the production is excellent, a perfect balance between sinister and poppy."

The first single from the album, "Mr. Hurricane", was released as a free Single of the Week on iTunes after the album's release.

In January 2011, the album was certified Gold by the CRIA for selling over 40,000 copies.

Track listing

Personnel 
 Beast
 Betty Bonifassi – Vocals
 Jean-Phi Goncalves – All instruments, production
 Alex McMahon - piano (3), organ (6, 12), keyboards (9, 12), string Arrangements (2) 
 Paul Hemmings - guitar (5, 6, 10) 
 Mélanie Auclair - cello  (tracks: 2, 6, 10)
Guido del Fabbro - violin (tracks: 2, 6, 10)
Cristobal Tapia de Veer - nylon guitar (track: 7)
 Tyrone Benskin - preacher, raps (track 9)
 Yann Perreau, Antoine Gratton, Marie-Pierre Fournier, Caroline d'été, Emilie Laforest, Sébastion Nasra, Vance Payn, Frank Deweare - backing vocals (Track: 5)

Credits
 Executive Producer, Artistic Director - Sébastion Nasra
 A&R Consultant - Kim Cooke
 Artwork Supervisor - Phillipe Normand
 Photography - Marianne Larochelle
 Assisted photography - Serge Landau
 Hair and Make-up - Leslie-Ann Thompson
 Sylists - Karine Lamontagne (Betty) and Eve Gravel (Jean-Phi)
 Graphic Designer - Jensy White
 Mixing - Pierre Girard
 Mastering - Adam Ayan

Chart positions

References 

2008 debut albums
Beast (Canadian band) albums